Mone May Par Naing is a 1965 Burmese black-and-white drama film, directed by Win Oo starring Win Oo, Tin Tin Mu, Thi Thi, Wah Wah Win Shwe and Aung Lwin.

Cast
Win Oo
Tin Tin Mu
Thi Thi
Wah Wah Win Shwe
Aung Lwin

References

1965 films
1960s Burmese-language films
Burmese drama films
Films shot in Myanmar
1965 drama films